Beauty & the Beat (stylized as beauty&thebeat) is the debut extended play by Loona yyxy, a sub-unit  of South Korean girl group Loona. It was released on May 30, 2018, by Blockberry Creative. The album consists of five tracks and features Canadian singer Grimes. The unit consisted of four members: Yves, Chuu, Go Won, and Olivia Hye.
In November 2022, Chuu was removed from the girl group Loona and consequently from the unit.

Promotion and release
The group began teasing the album on May 10, 2018, and continued releasing photos of the group and individual members, along with image teasers of each track, during the following weeks. On May 20, it was confirmed that Grimes would be featured on the "love4eva" through teasers from the group and by Grimes herself.

The album was released on May 30, along with the official music video for "love4eva". The group performed "love4eva" live for the first time on June 2, at the Premier Greeting – Line&Up event, which also officially introduced Loona's full lineup to fans.

Track listing
Credits adapted from Naver.

Notes
All track titles are stylized in all lowercase

Charts

References

External links
 Beauty & the Beat at Vlending Co., Ltd.

2018 debut EPs
Korean-language EPs
Loona (group) EPs